Dasappa may refer to

H. C. Dasappa, Indian politician.
Tulasidas Dasappa, Indian politician.
Yashodhara Dasappa, Indian politician.